Billy Jim is a 1922 American silent comedy western film directed by Frank Borzage and starring Fred Stone, Marian Skinner and George Hernandez.

Cast
 Fred Stone as 	Billy Jim
 Millicent Fisher as 	Marsha Dunforth
 George Hernandez as 	Dudley Dunforth
 Billy Bletcher as 	Jimmy
 Marian Skinner as 	Mrs. Dunforth
 Frank Thorne as 	Roy Forsythe

References

Bibliography
 Munden, Kenneth White. The American Film Institute Catalog of Motion Pictures Produced in the United States, Part 1. University of California Press, 1997.

External links
 

1922 films
1922 Western (genre) films
American black-and-white films
Films directed by Frank Borzage
Film Booking Offices of America films
Silent American Western (genre) films
1920s English-language films
American silent feature films
1920s American films